is the southern terminal of the Toei Asakusa Line, a subway line operated by the Tokyo Metropolitan Bureau of Transportation. It is located in Ōta, Tokyo, Japan and is the southernmost station of the Tokyo subway network. Its station number is A-01.

History
Nishi-magome opened on November 15, 1968, as a station on Toei Line 1. In 1978, the line took its present name.

Platforms
Nishi-magome has two platforms. Because this is the terminal station, trains on both tracks go in the same direction.

Surroundings
The station is located underneath the Daini Keihin highway, and serves the Nishi-Magome and Minami-Magome neighborhoods. It is one of the closest stations to the temple of Ikegami Honmon-ji.

The next station to the north-east is Magome Station.

Nishi-magome is located directly north of the Magome train car repair facility which handles maintenance for rolling stock used on the Toei Asakusa Line and Oedo Line. Oedo Line trains access this facility by passing through the Asakusa Line using a connecting tunnel near Shimbashi Station (Shiodome Station on the Oedo Line).

Railway stations in Japan opened in 1968
Railway stations in Tokyo
Toei Asakusa Line
Ōta, Tokyo